The Burdekin River is a river located in North and Far North Queensland, Australia. The Burdekin River is Australia's largest river by (peak) discharge volume.

The river was first encountered by Europeans during the expedition led by Ludwig Leichhardt in 1845 and named in honour of Thomas Burdekin, one of the sponsors of the expedition.

Course and features
In the river's upper catchment, from its source the river generally flows west and then south out of the Girringun National Park, part of the UNESCO Wet Tropics World Heritage Area. This area, now part of Basalt was the location of one of the earliest inland settlements in northern Australia and was known as Dalrymple. The river is joined by Lucy Creek, the Running River, Star River and Keelbottom Creek, above . From the west in the Dry Tropics to the west of the river, the river is joined by the Clarke, Basalt and Dry rivers. South of Charters Towers, the upper catchment of the Burdekin River is joined by the Fanning River, and then continues to flow south through wetlands before entering Lake Dalrymple, the reservoir created by the Burdekin Dam.

Within Lake Dalrymple, the Burdekin River is joined by the Cape, Suttor/Belyando rivers.

Below the dam wall, in the river's lower catchment, is northern Australia's largest irrigation area with approximately  under irrigation, predominantly for growing sugarcane. It consists of two broad regions, the earlier established delta region located on the coarse sedimentary deposits of the Burdekin River Delta, a groundwater dominated scheme, and the Burdekin Haughton Water Supply Scheme (BHWSS) – a more recently developed surface water dominated scheme on alluvial floodplains of the Burdekin River. Here the Burdekin is joined by the Bowen and Bogie rivers.

The Burdekin River descends  over its  course.

Four DIWA wetlands can be found along the course of the river. The first is at the Valley of Lagoons in the upper region of the catchment, the next is a Lake Dalrymple, then at the junction of the Burdekin and Bowen rivers known as the Burdekin-Bowen Junction and Blue Valley Weir Aggregation and the last is at the river delta which forms a  wetland.

The Burdekin River is one of the most economically important rivers in Australia, and has the fourth-largest watershed of any exorheic drainage system in Australia. It is also the fourth-largest river in Australia by volume of flow, but is so erratic that its discharge can reach the mean discharge of the Yangtze River (after two severe cyclones in 1958) or have as many as seven months with no flow whatsoever (as in 1923). This exceedingly erratic flow is due to the extreme variability of precipitation throughout the entire basin. Annual rainfall at most gauges within the basin can range from  depending on the monsoon and the number of cyclones that cross the coast. It has the highest mean annual flow for any river adjacent to the Great Barrier Reef.

History

Gugu Badhun (also known as Koko-Badun and Kokopatun) is an Australian Aboriginal language of North Queensland. The language region includes areas within the local government area of Charters Towers Region, particularly the localities of Greenvale and the Valley of Lagoons, and in the Upper Burdekin River area and in Abergowrie.

Yuru (also known as Juru, Euronbba, Juru, Mal Mal, Malmal) is an Australian Aboriginal language spoken on Yuru country. The Yuru language region includes the landscape within the local government boundaries of the Shire of Burdekin, including the town of Home Hill.

The river was first discovered by Europeans by John Clements Wickham aboard  in 1839 who named it the Wickham River. In 1849, Ludwig Leichhardt named the river after Thomas Burdekin, one of the sponsors of Leichhardt's expedition.  Because he was inland away from the coast he was not aware it was the same watercourse named by Wickham. The town of Wickham was established on Rita Island at the river mouth but was soon swept away during a flood in the 1860s.

Pastoralists had established runs along the river during the 1860s, with some along the lower reached taken for selection in the 1880s.

In 1899, the Burdekin River Rail Bridge was built over the river about 24 km NE of Charters Towers to carry the Great Northern railway. Although replaced by a new bridge in 1964, the old bridge remains and is listed on the Queensland Heritage Register.

The townships of Ayr and Brandon were established in 1882 with many sugarmills being erected. The North Coast railway between Ayr and Townsville had the Inkerman Bridge over the Burdekin River from McDesme to Home Hill which was built in 1913 followed by bridge for road traffic in 1930. Both were too low and often damaged during flooding and the decision was made to replace them with a higher dual level bridge known as the Silver Link. Construction commenced in 1947 and was not completed until 1957 when the bridge opened.

A weir was constructed in a gorge in the Leichhardt Range for settlement farms near Clare and Dalbeg in 1953 for growing tobacco. In 1984 construction of the Burdekin Falls Dam commenced and was completed by 1987 when the dam started to fill forming Lake Dalrymple.

Floods

Floods events occur on average from no floods to three per year between December and March.

The waters washed away dwellings, fencing and livestock and effects downstream included the loss of the steamer  which was unable to steer effectively and ran aground on a reef at the entrance of Flinders Channel.

In 1917 more severe flooding occurred with the bridge at Inkerman under  of water and the one at Ayr over  underwater after a day of flooding. Approximately one third of the Inkerman Bridge was later washed away by the floodwaters.

Water storage

The Burdekin Falls Dam, the largest dam in Queensland was constructed west of Ayr and Home Hill and completed in 1987 to form what is also known as Lake Dalrymple.

As part of the proposed Bradfield Scheme the upper Burdekin River was to be used to feed water by gravity westwards to the upper reaches of the Flinders River.

Irrigation
On the lower Burdekin floodplain an irrigation area was established in the early 1950s. At first only Gorge Weir and Blue Valley Weir provided water to the scheme, until the 1970s when Eungella Dam also provided water. Water is also drawn from the Haughton River. Major pump stations are located at Clare Weir feeding water to both sides of the river.

In the delta around Ayr and Home Hill, groundwater is used extensively to irrigate crops of sugar cane. This groundwater is recharged artificially during the extreme flood events that occasionally occur, usually due to a La Niña event. The use of groundwater in the floodplain is carefully managed so that supply can be maintained during the dry season and to prevent saltwater intrusion.

Watershed

The North Coast railway line crosses the river at Home Hill, via a bridge constructed in 1913. At the same location the Bruce Highway traverses the river via the Burdekin Bridge.  Further west, the river is crossed by the Flinders Highway.

Although on paper most of the basin of the Burdekin appears perfect for rainfed crops like cotton and maize, in fact the rainfall is so erratic that in almost every year a would-be farmer will experience either too little or too much rain for the crop to mature properly. Thus, most of the basin of the Burdekin can be used only for low-density grazing of sheep and cattle, since grazing is less likely to be damaged economically and ecologically by the extreme risks of an extraordinarily erratic climate.

The Valley of Lagoons Station was established in 1862 after the area in the upper reaches of the Burdekin was opened up by the government. Initially stocked with sheep, the property was later used to raise cattle. In 1864, Inkerman Station was established toward the lower reaches, where the town of Inkerman now stands. The area was plagued by cattle tick, so the government acquired the property in 1910 and sold it off as farmland where sugarcane was later grown.

The natural vegetation away from the coast is a grassland dominated by perennial Mitchell and annual Flinders grasses. Near the coast there are patches of dry eucalypt forest on the typically infertile laterised soils characteristic of most of Australia.

The mine is currently dormant, but in 1981 the mine discharged toxic waste containing unacceptable levels of radioactivity, when its tailing dam overflowed into a creek that feeds into the Burdekin.

Wildlife
Neosilurus mollespiculum is a species of eeltail catfish endemic to the Burdekin. Many other species such as Agassiz's glassfish, Banded grunter, Barramundi, Black catfish, Eastern rainbowfish, Empire gudgeon, Freshwater longtom, Mangrove Jack, Tilapia and Yellowbelly are found throughout the catchment.

See also

Burdekin Gap

References

External links

 
North Queensland
Bodies of water of the Coral Sea
Rivers of Far North Queensland